Gayan Maneeshan (born 25 February 1991) is a Sri Lankan cricketer. He is a left-handed wicket-keeper batsman. He made his first-class debut for Sinhalese Sports Club in the 2010–11 Premier Trophy on 18 March 2011.

References

External links
 

1991 births
Living people
Sri Lankan cricketers
Chilaw Marians Cricket Club cricketers
Kurunegala Youth Cricket Club cricketers
Ruhuna cricketers
Sinhalese Sports Club cricketers
Sri Lanka Ports Authority Cricket Club cricketers
Sportspeople from Kurunegala
Wicket-keepers